The 2021–22 Úrvalsdeild kvenna, known as the Olís-deildin for sponsorship reasons, was the 83rd season of the Úrvalsdeild kvenna, Iceland's premier women's handball league. 

KA/Þór are the defending champions, from the 2020–21 season, where they won their first title.

Team information
Following eight teams are competing in the 2021–22 Úrvalsdeild kvenna hanbolti.

Head coaches

Regular season

Standings

References

External links
 Icelandic Handball Association 

Handball in Iceland
2021 in Icelandic women's sport
2022 in Icelandic women's sport
Úrvalsdeild kvenna